The white-fronted quail-dove (Geotrygon leucometopia) is a species of bird in the family Columbidae. It is endemic to the Dominican Republic on the Caribbean island of Hispaniola; it is possibly extirpated from Haiti.

Taxonomy and systematics

The white-fronted quail-dove and most of the other species in the genus Geotrygon were previously in Oreopeleia. In addition, it was considered conspecific with what is now the grey-fronted quail-dove (Geotrygon caniceps) under the name "grey-headed quail-dove". It is monotypic.

Description

The adult has a bold white forehead ("front"), and the rest of its head is slate gray. The sides of its neck have a reddish purple or violet cast that sometimes extends onto the gray breast. The lower belly is reddish. The upperparts are a darker gray than the head and have a metallic purplish blue sheen. Its eyes are red. Juveniles are browner than adults ,and do not have the purple sheen on the neck and breast.

Distribution and habitat

The white-fronted quail-dove is confirmed to exist only in a few areas in the west of the Dominican Republic. Unconfirmed historical accounts placed it in adjoining southeastern Haiti as well.

Behavior

Feeding

The white-fronted quail-dove's diet is seeds and small invertebrates like insects, grubs, and caterpillars.

Breeding

The white-fronted quail-dove builds a nest of twigs and leaves lined with rootlets and grass and places it low in undergrowth or a vine tangle. The clutch size is usually one or two, but three eggs have been reported.

Vocalization

The white-fronted quail-dove's song is a "long series  of short, low-pitched 'haoo' or 'cooo' notes, given either very rapidly in the former instance or more slowly...in [the] second".

Status

The IUCN has assessed the white-fronted quail-dove as Endangered. It has a very small range and its estimated population of fewer than 1700 adults is declining due to habitat loss, hunting, and introduced predators.

References

white-fronted quail-dove
Birds of the Dominican Republic
Endemic fauna of the Dominican Republic
Endemic birds of Hispaniola
white-fronted quail-dove
Taxa named by Frank Chapman (ornithologist)